LQTM or variation, may refer to:

 linear quantum Turing machine, a type of quantum Turing machine
 lqtm (laughing quietly to myself), a texting abbreviation

See also

 LQ (disambiguation), including trademarks "LQ" (ie. LQ™)